"Money to Burn" is a song written by Johnny Nelms and recorded by American country music artist George Jones.  It was released on the Mercury label as the B-side to his 1959 single "Big Harlan Taylor" and became a hit, reaching #15 on the Billboard country survey.  The song is similar in theme to the Joe "Red" Hayes song "A Satisfied Mind" in that it observes how worthless wealth can be without love ("A wealth of love is worth much more than all my money to burn").  Jones himself exhibited an ambivalent attitude towards wealth himself for much of his life; although entrenched in the country music business, he remained unimpressed by stardom.  In 2006 he explained to Billboard magazine, "A lot of artists come to the big city of Nashville with dollar signs floating around in their heads, they're gonna get a lot of glory and popularity and be somebody and all this crap...you've got to have a love for it to be successful."

1959 songs
George Jones songs
Song recordings produced by Pappy Daily